Timothy John Lang (born 9 November 1985) is an Australian professional basketball player for the Kilsyth Cobras of the NBL1 South. He played three years of college basketball for Stetson University before starting a successful SEABL career with the Kilsyth Cobras. He also had two stints in the NBL for the Melbourne Tigers, and won a championship with German club Erdgas Ehingen/Urspringschule in 2010–11.

Early life and career
Born in Melbourne, Victoria, Lang attended Overnewton Anglican Community College in the suburb of Keilor, where he graduated from in 2002. After graduating from high school, Lang began a business degree at Deakin University and started playing competitive basketball for the Keilor Thunder in 2004. He averaged 13.1 points, 8.3 rebounds, 1.0 assists and 1.7 blocks in 25 games during his first season for the Thunder, helping his team win the Victorian Basketball League (VBL) Division 1 championship.

Lang continued to play for the Thunder in 2005 and 2006, with the team having moved up a division after winning in 2004. In 2005, he averaged 14.8 points, 9.2 rebounds, 1.1 assists and 2.5 blocks in 18 games. In 2006, he averaged 17.1 points, 12.3 rebounds, 2.1 assists and 1.8 blocks in 20 games.

On 1 June 2006, Lang signed a National Letter of Intent to play college basketball for Stetson University in the United States.

College career
Lang joined the Stetson Hatters men's basketball program for the 2006–07 season with sophomore eligibility. In his first season with the Hatters, Lang played in all 31 games while receiving six starting assignments. He tied for fifth on the team in scoring at 5.4 points per game, and finished second on the team in rebounding with 3.5 per game. On 13 February 2007, he scored a career-high 20 points against Savannah State, shooting 5-of-7 from the field and a perfect 10-of-10 from the free throw line.

As a junior playing for Stetson in 2007–08, Lang appeared in all 32 games with 22 starts. He led the team in blocks with 16 and scored in double figures four times. On 5 January 2008, he scored a season-high 14 points against North Florida. He finished the season with averages of 4.3 points and 2.8 rebounds in 15.1 minutes per game.

As a senior in 2008–09, Lang appeared in all 30 games with 27 starts, and he again led the team in blocks with 35. He also finished second in rebounding (5.2) and fourth in scoring (6.5). On 24 November 2008, he recorded his first career double-double with 13 points and 11 rebounds against Johnson & Wales. He later recorded two more over the final fives games of the season, both coming with season highs of 18 points. He finished his three-year career at Stetson with a total of 81 blocked shots, placing him seventh all-time for the Hatters.

Professional career

SEABL, NBL and Germany (2009–2012)
In May 2009, Lang signed with the Kilsyth Cobras for the rest of the 2009 SEABL season. He had an impressive debut season for the Cobras, averaging 11.2 points and 6.9 rebounds in 18 games, and subsequently earned a trial with the Melbourne Tigers at the NBL's Top End Challenge in early September. His pre-season stint earned him a full-time contract with the Tigers for the 2009–10 NBL season. He played in 10 games for the Tigers between 30 September and 21 November before failing to appear in any further games for the rest of the season.

On 3 March 2010, Lang re-signed with the Cobras for the 2010 SEABL season. In 28 games for the Cobras in 2010, he averaged 14.1 points, 6.7 rebounds and 1.1 assists per game.

In September 2010, Lang signed with German club Erdgas Ehingen/Urspringschule for the 2010–11 ProB season. He helped the team win the championship, and averaged 8.3 points, 5.2 rebounds 1.3 assists in 31 games. Following the conclusion of the German season, he returned to Melbourne and re-joined the Cobras for the 2011 SEABL season. In 23 games for the Cobras in 2011, he averaged 14.5 points, 8.7 rebounds and 2.1 assists per game. He subsequently earned selection to the SEABL All-Star Team.

On 25 November 2011, Lang signed with the Melbourne Tigers for the rest of the 2011–12 NBL season following a hamstring injury to Matt Burston. Three days later, he re-signed with the Cobras for the 2012 season. In 15 games for the Tigers, he averaged 1.2 points in 5.1 minutes per game. He then managed 15.0 points, a career-high 9.3 rebounds and 1.2 assists in 27 games for the Cobras in 2012.

Kilsyth Cobras (2013–2016)
On 5 December 2012, Lang re-signed with the Kilsyth Cobras for the 2013 season. In 29 games for the Cobras in 2013, he averaged 15.0 points, 8.3 rebounds and 1.6 assists per game.

On 22 October 2013, Lang re-signed with the Cobras for the 2014 season. He led his team to the SEABL South Conference Grand Final in 2014, where they were defeated 70–68 by eventual champions, the Mount Gambier Pioneers. In 29 games that year, Lang averaged a career-high 19.8 points, 8.5 rebounds and 2.1 assists per game.

In December 2014, Lang re-signed with the Cobras for the 2015 season. In 24 games for the Cobras in 2015, he averaged 15.3 points, 7.5 rebounds and 1.7 assists per game.

On 8 December 2015, Lang re-signed with the Cobras for the 2016 season. On 30 July 2016, he played his 200th SEABL game, becoming the fifteenth Cobra to have his jersey hung up at Kilsyth's Hugh McMenamin Court. In 24 games for the Cobras in 2016, he averaged 15.8 points, 8.4 rebounds and 2.2 assists per game.

Dandenong Rangers (2017–2019)
After eight seasons with Kilsyth, Lang parted ways with the Cobras following the 2016 season and joined the Dandenong Rangers for the 2017 season. He helped the Rangers reach the SEABL South Conference Grand Final in 2017, where he won his first conference championship following Dandenong's 102–94 overtime win over the Ballarat Miners. The Rangers went on to lose to the Mount Gambier Pioneers for the SEABL National Championship. Lang appeared in all 28 games for the Rangers in 2017, averaging 10.1 points, 5.3 rebounds and 1.0 assists per game.

On 9 September 2017, Lang was called-up by the Perth Wildcats to join their pre-season roster for their game against the New Zealand Breakers. In just under 17 minutes off the bench, Lang recorded four points, three rebounds and one assist in an 80–72 win. He also played for the Wildcats the following day, recording three points, one rebound and one assist in just under 17 minutes off the bench in a 93–67 loss to Melbourne United.

Lang returned to the Rangers for the 2018 season. In 20 games, he averaged 9.4 points, 5.0 rebounds and 1.5 assists per game.

Lang returned to the Rangers for the 2019 season, with the SEABL now disbanded and replaced with NBL1. He started in all 21 of the Rangers' games in 2019, averaging 11.5 points, 5.6 rebounds and 1.8 assists per game.

Return to Kilsyth (2021–present)
In March 2021, Lang signed to return to the Kilsyth Cobras for the 2021 NBL1 South season. He served as captain. He re-signed with the Cobras in December 2021 for the 2022 season. He missed nine games in 2022 with a leg injury but managed to play his 300th SEABL/NBL1 game. He re-signed with the Cobras in March 2023 for the 2023 season.

References

External links
Stetson Hatters bio
ESPN.com profile
FIBA.com profile
Kilsyth Cobras profile
SEABL profile
2017 SEABL stats

1985 births
Living people
Australian men's basketball players
Australian expatriate basketball people in Germany
Australian expatriate basketball people in the United States
Basketball players from Melbourne
Centers (basketball)
Melbourne Tigers players
Stetson Hatters men's basketball players